Change of Heart is the fifth studio album by the Italian/U.S. ensemble Change. It was released in 1984 and reached number one hundred and two on the US Billboard Album Chart, fifteen on the US Billboard Black Albums chart, and number thirty-four on the UK Albums Chart. Change of Heart includes the singles "Change of Heart", "It Burns Me Up", "You Are My Melody" and "Say You Love Me Again".

The band recorded and mixed the songs for album at Umbi Recording Studios, Italy, Creation Audio, Minneapolis and Mediasound, New York City. The sessions were then taken to Atlantic Recording Studios, New York City to be mastered. The album was originally released as an LP in April 1984. The artwork was designed by Greg Porto.

Track listing

Personnel

Change
 Timmy Allen - Bass, Keyboards, Background Vocals, Lead Vocals (on track 7)
 Rick Brennen - Lead Vocals, Background Vocals
 Deborah Cooper - Lead Vocals, Background Vocals
 Vince Henry - Guitar, Saxophone
 Michael Campbell - Guitar
 Jeff Bova - Synthesizer, Keyboards
 Toby Johnson - Drums

Additional Personnel
 Jimmy Jam - Keyboards, Synthesizer
 Bernard Davis - Drums
 O. Nicholas Rath - Guitar
 Bobby Douglas, Terry Lewis, Lucia Newell, Gwendolyn Traylor - Additional Background Vocals

Production
Executive Producer: Jacques Fred Petrus (for Little Macho Music Co., Inc.)
Arranged and Produced by Jimmy Jam and Terry Lewis (for Flyte Tyme Productions) 
Tracks 4, 7 and 8 co-produced by Timmy Allen 
Recorded by Steve Weise and Craig Bishop at Umbi Recording Studio, (Italy), Creation Audio (Minneapolis) and Media Sound (New York City)
Mixed at Media Sound by Michael Brauer (for MHB Productions)
Mastered by Dennis King at Atlantic Studio, New York 
Gwendolyn Traylor - Production Assistant
Steve Bogen - Album Coordination
Greg Porto - Design

Charts

References 

1984 albums
Change (band) albums
Atlantic Records albums
Albums produced by Jimmy Jam and Terry Lewis